Topolšica ( or ) is a settlement in the Municipality of Šoštanj in northern Slovenia. The area is part of the traditional region of Styria. The municipality is now included in the Savinja Statistical Region. The Topolšica spa and the Topolšica Hospital are located in the settlement.

History
At the end of the Second World War after the German Instrument of Surrender, General Löhr signed the act of surrender on 9 May 1945 in the spa building in the settlement. The room is now a small museum that commemorates the event.

Church
The local church is dedicated to Saint James and belongs to the Parish of Šoštanj. It dates to the 16th century with major rebuilding around 1830.

Notable people 
The Slovenian poet and writer Pavla Rovan (1908–1999) died in Topolšica on 12 June 1999.

References

External links
Topolšica at Geopedia

Populated places in the Municipality of Šoštanj
Spa towns in Slovenia